Robert A. Metzger (born 1956) is an American electrical engineer and science fiction author. He was a Nebula Award finalist in the novel category in 2002 for his second novel, Picoverse.

Metzger began writing science fiction stories as a child, but it was not until 1987 that he sold his first science fiction short story. He published his first novel, Quad World, in 1991. It was not until 2002 that he published Picoverse; he published his third and most recent novel, Cusp, in 2005.

Metzger's works are widely considered hard science fiction. Greg Bear called him "one of our most ambitious writers of high-tech, hard physics science fiction."

Metzger holds a B.S., an M.S., and a Ph.D. in electrical engineering from UCLA. He is co-founder of the technical journal Compound Semiconductor, and has authored over a hundred professional research papers. He has also written several articles on science for a popular audience for Wired magazine, and has published speculative studies involving climate engineering and space propulsion, co-authored with fellow scientist/science fiction novelists Gregory Benford and Geoffrey Landis, respectively. Metzger is also active with the Science Fiction and Fantasy Writers of America (SFWA).

Metzger is currently the Chief Technical Officer (CTO) at Kyma Technologies in Raleigh, NC.  He works in the areas of equipment development and crystal growth of GaN and AlN alloys by hydride vapour phase epitaxy (HVPE) and Physical Vapor Deposition (PVD), as well as the development of photoconductive semiconductor switches (PCSS) used for pulsed power applications, generation of high power microwaves (HPM) and electromagnetic pulses (EMP).

Works
 Cusp (Science Fiction). Published by Ace, 2005. .
 Picoverse (Science Fiction). Published by Ace, 2002. .
 Quad World (Science Fiction). Published by New American Library, 1991. .

External links
2002 Nebula Award finalists

1956 births
Living people
20th-century American novelists
21st-century American novelists
American male novelists
American science fiction writers
University of California, Los Angeles alumni
American electrical engineers
American male short story writers
20th-century American short story writers
21st-century American short story writers
20th-century American male writers
21st-century American male writers